Jahan Pahlavan was a rank champion in the Iranian Guards before the Battle of al-Qadisiyyah.

In the book Shahnameh, Ferdowsi calls Rostam, the son of Zāl, "Jahan Pahlavan".

In contemporary Iranian history, Gholamreza Takhti is referred to as the "Jahan Pahlavan". According to Sadruddin Elahi, the term "Jahan Pahlavan" in reference to Gholamreza Takhti was first used by Siavash Kasrai in a poem by him called the Jahan Pahlavan, and this title remained on the throne.

See also 
 Pahlavan (Iranian title)
 Pahlevan of Iran

References 

Military ranks